Anthony Darrell Womack (born September 25, 1969) is an American former professional baseball player. He played all or parts of 13 seasons in Major League Baseball (MLB), with most of his career spent with the Pittsburgh Pirates and the Arizona Diamondbacks, then with several other teams during his last four years. A middle infielder, Womack was recognized for his speed and base-stealing prowess and his key hits in the 2001 playoffs which led to the 2001 World Series win over the New York Yankees.

Early life
Womack was born in Java, Virginia. He is a graduate of Gretna High School in Gretna, Virginia and Guilford College in Greensboro, North Carolina.

Career
Womack was drafted by the Pittsburgh Pirates in 1991 MLB draft and became their everyday second baseman in 1997. That year, which was his first full year in the MLB, he played in his only All-Star Game and led the National League in stolen bases (60). In 1998, he again led the National League in stolen bases (58). After the 1998 season, he was traded to the Diamondbacks for two minor leaguers. The Diamondbacks moved Womack from second base to right field in 1999, then to shortstop in 2000. In 1999, Womack led the major leagues in stolen bases (72) which set a Diamondback record for most stolen bases in a season.

Womack was an important part of the Arizona Diamondbacks' world championship team in 2001, especially with two key base hits that both came in the bottom of the ninth inning of deciding games in the playoffs. Womack ended the first-round series with a walk-off single off the Cardinals' Steve Kline. Later, Womack set up Luis Gonzalez' famous game-winning single in Game 7 of the World Series with a game-tying one-out hit against the Yankees' Mariano Rivera. Womack's game-tying double was cited by the Wall Street Journal as the most significant clutch hit in baseball history.
Womack owns the Diamondbacks record for most stolen bases in a career (182).

Womack signed with the Red Sox but was traded to the Cardinals before the start of the 2004 season, and he was moved back to his original position at second base. After recovering from Tommy John surgery and a disappointing 2003 season, Womack batted a career-high .307 with five home runs, 38 runs batted in, and 26 stolen bases for the Cardinals.

After the 2004 season, Womack chose to sign with the New York Yankees, rather than wait for the Cardinals to offer him an extension. Despite turning in a productive 2004, Womack struggled with the Yankees in 2005, losing his starting second base job to Robinson Canó.

In 2006, after being released by the Reds, the Chicago Cubs signed him to a minor league deal and called him up on May 26. Womack was designated for assignment on June 30 and became a free agent on July 10. He received a non-roster invitation to spring training with the Washington Nationals for the 2007 season, but was released on March 8, ending his playing career.

See also
List of Major League Baseball annual stolen base leaders
List of Major League Baseball annual triples leaders
List of Major League Baseball career stolen bases leaders

References

External links

1969 births
Living people
African-American baseball players
American expatriate baseball players in Canada
Arizona Diamondbacks players
Augusta Pirates players
Baseball players from Virginia
Buffalo Bisons (minor league) players
Calgary Cannons players
Carolina Mudcats players
Chicago Cubs players
Cincinnati Reds players
Colorado Rockies players
El Paso Diablos players
Guilford Quakers baseball players
Iowa Cubs players
Major League Baseball second basemen
Major League Baseball shortstops
National League All-Stars
National League stolen base champions
New York Yankees players
People from Pittsylvania County, Virginia
Pittsburgh Pirates players
Salem Buccaneers players
Sportspeople from Danville, Virginia
St. Louis Cardinals players
Tucson Sidewinders players
Welland Pirates players
21st-century African-American people
20th-century African-American sportspeople